The 2001 WNBA season was the fourth season for the Detroit Shock.

Offseason

WNBA Draft

Regular season

Season standings

Season schedule

Player stats

References

Detroit Shock seasons
Detroit
Detroit Shock